Capitol Theater, Capitol Theatre, or Capitol Cinema may refer to:

Australia
 Capitol Theatre (Melbourne), Victoria
 Capitol Theatre, Perth, Western Australia
 Capitol Theatre, Sydney, New South Wales

Canada
 Capitol Cinema (Ottawa), Ottawa, Ontario
 Capitol Theatre (Moncton), Moncton, New Brunswick
 Capitol Theatre (Port Hope), Port Hope, Ontario
 Capitol Theatre (Windsor, Ontario), Windsor, Ontario
 Capitol Theatre (Woodstock, Ontario), Woodstock, Ontario
 Capitole de Québec, Quebec City, Quebec

Germany
 Capitol Theater (Düsseldorf)

India
 Capitol Cinema (Mumbai), Maharashtra

Ireland
 Capitol Theatre (Dublin)

Philippines
 Capitol Theater (Manila)

Singapore
 Capitol Theatre, Singapore, a cinema from 1931 to 1998, reopened 2015.

United Kingdom
 Capitol Theatre, Manchester
 Capitol Theatre, Aberdeen
 Capitol Theatre, Cardiff
 Capitol Cinema, Southgate, London (demolished 1982)
 Capitol Theatre, Scarborough, (1929–1977)

United States
 Capitol Theater (Clearwater, Florida)
 Capitol Theater (Burlington, Iowa), Burlington, Iowa, listed on the National Register of Historic Places (NRHP) in Iowa
 Capitol Theatre in the NRHP-listed Kahl Building, Davenport, Iowa
 Capitol Theater Building, Arlington, Massachusetts, NRHP-listed
 Capitol Theatre Building (Flint, Michigan), listed on the NRHP in Michigan
 Capitol Center for the Arts, formerly the Capitol Theatre, Concord, New Hampshire
 Capitol Theatre (Passaic), New Jersey
 Capitol Theatre (New York City)
 Capitol Theatre (Port Chester, New York), NRHP-listed
 Capitol Theatre (Rome, New York)
 Capitol Theatre in Bismarck, North Dakota, now the Dakota Stage Playhouse
 Capitol Theater (Columbus, Ohio), operated by the Columbus Association for the Performing Arts
 Capitol Theater (Salem, Oregon)
 Capitol Theatre Center, Chambersburg, Pennsylvania
 Capitol Theatre (Union City, Tennessee), listed on the NRHP in Tennessee
 Capitol Theatre (Salt Lake City), Utah, see buildings and sites of Salt Lake City
 Capitol Theater (Olympia), Washington
 Capitol Theatre (Yakima, Washington), NRHP-listed
 Capitol Theatre (Wheeling, West Virginia)
 Capitol Theater (Madison, Wisconsin)
Hargray Capitol Theatre, Macon, Georgia

See also
Capital theater (disambiguation)